U-Turn is the seventeenth studio album by American soul musician Isaac Hayes. The album was released in 1986, by Columbia Records.

Track listing

References

1986 albums
Isaac Hayes albums
albums produced by Isaac Hayes
Columbia Records albums